The 1960–61 Tercera División season was the 25th since its establishment.

League tables

Group I

Group II

Group III

Group IV

Group V

Group VI

Group VII

Group VIII

Group IX

Group X

Group XI

Group XII

Group XIII

Group XIV

Promotion playoff

Champions

First round

Final Round

Runners-up

First round

Second round

Final Round

Season records
 Most wins: 24, Racing de Ferrol, Real Avilés and Albacete.
 Most draws: 11, Jerez Industrial and Alcázar.
 Most losses: 25, Callosa.
 Most goals for: 103, Racing de Ferrol.
 Most goals against: 112, Cardessar and San Lorenzo.
 Most points: 51, Racing de Ferrol, Sevilla Atlético and Recreativo de Huelva.
 Fewest wins: 3, Flavia, Naval, Alginet and Callosa.
 Fewest draws: 0, Abarán.
 Fewest losses: 2, Gimnàstic de Tarragona, Sevilla Atlético and Recreativo de Huelva.
 Fewest goals for: 18, Naval.
 Fewest goals against: 13, Recreativo de Huelva.
 Fewest points: 6, Callosa.

Notes

External links
RSSSF 
Futbolme 

Tercera División seasons
3
Spain